Halfmoon Pass, elevation , is a mountain pass at the East end of the La Garita Mountain Range that forms the boundary between Mineral and Saguache counties. The pass separates the Saquache Creek and West Bellows Creek watersheds in the La Garita Mountains of Colorado. Both creeks are part of the Rio Grande River watershed.

References

Landforms of Saguache County, Colorado
Landforms of Mineral County, Colorado
Mountain passes of Colorado
Great Divide of North America